Now and Then is the third studio album by the Canadian country music artist Michelle Wright. It was released on May 22, 1992, on Arista Nashville. The album's first single, "Take It Like a Man", became Wright's first number one hit on the Canadian RPM Country Tracks chart and her only top ten hit on the U.S. Billboard Hot Country Singles & Tracks chart. Two more singles, "One Time Around" and "Guitar Talk", also topped the Canadian RPM Country Tracks chart.

Track listing 
 "Take It Like a Man" (Tony Haselden) - 3:57
 "If I'm Ever Over You" (Mark D. Sanders, Trisha Yearwood) - 3:08
 "Now and Then" (Gary Harrison, Karen Staley) - 3:47
 "One Time Around" (Chapin Hartford, Don Pfrimmer) - 3:33
 "He Would Be Sixteen" (Charlie Black, Jill Colucci, Austin Roberts) - 3:45
 "The Change" (Steve Bogard, Rick Giles) - 3:44
 "Don't Start with Me" (Bogard, Michael Clark) - 3:35
 "Guitar Talk" (Bogard, Colin Linden) - 3:34
 "Fastest Healing Wounded Heart" (Pat Bunch, Curtis Stone) - 3:00
 "A Little More Comfortable" (Hartford) - 3:46

Personnel 
As listed in liner notes.
 Bruce Bouton – pedal steel guitar, Weissenborn
 Spady Brannan – bass guitar
 Sonny Garrish – pedal steel guitar, pedabro
 Rick Giles – background vocals 
 Carl Marsh – Fairlight
 Brent Mason – electric guitar
 Steve Nathan – piano, keyboards
 Karen Staley – background vocals
 Catherine Styron – keyboards
 Biff Watson – acoustic guitar
 Lari White – background vocals
 John Willis – acoustic guitar, mandolin
 Lonnie Wilson – drums
 Michelle Wright – lead vocals

Chart performance

Weekly charts

Year-end charts

References 

Arista Records albums
Michelle Wright albums
1992 albums